Zoratu Pain (also Romanized as Z̄oratū Pā’īn and Z̄orratū-ye Pā’īn) is a village in Gohreh Rural District, Fin District, Bandar Abbas County, Hormozgan Province, Iran. At the 2006 census, its population was 31, in 8 families.

References 

Populated places in Bandar Abbas County